The FN HiPer is a semi automatic pistol manufactured by FN Herstal exclusively for Armed Forces/Paramilitary/LE sales.

Overview
The FN HiPer is a semi automatic striker fired pistol. The weapon is chambered in 9x19mm NATO and fed from a 15 round magazine. The FN HiPer has improved ergonomics for ambidextrous handling and accuracy.

See also
List of pistols

References

External links
FN HiPer

9mm Parabellum semi-automatic pistols
FN Herstal firearms
Semi-automatic pistols of Belgium
Weapons and ammunition introduced in 2022